Andre Boyer may refer to:

 Andre Boyer (actor), Japanese-born American film and television actor
 Andre Boyer (poker player), French-Canadian poker player